United Learning is a group of state-funded schools and fee-paying private schools operating in England. United Learning is the trading name for United Church Schools Trust (UCST) and United Learning Trust (ULT). It is one of the largest 10 charities with the most employees in the UK, with central offices in Peterborough, London and Salford. It is governed by a board of trustees and run by an executive team. In 2012, ULT and UCST rebranded to operate under one name, United Learning. They legally remain as two separate charities.

History 
United Church Schools Trust began life as the Church Schools Company, formed in 1883 by a committee including the Archbishop of Canterbury. The company was formed in response to the lack of academic education available for girls. The first school the company opened was Surbiton High School in 1884. By 1885, the company had 10 schools with 653 pupils between them.

United Learning Trust was formed in 2002 as a subsidiary of the United Church Schools Trust (which comprised independent schools only) in response to the government's invitation to develop new state academies. United Learning Trust's first academy, Manchester Academy, opened in 2003, replacing Ducie High School, a school with a severe truancy problem; the academy received an "outstanding" report from Ofsted in 2009. Inspectors noted: "No matter what their background, all groups of students make outstanding progress as they move through the years."

In 2012, it was agreed that United Church Schools Trust and United Learning Trust should come together under the same branding, 'United Learning', bringing together the state and independent schools represented by the two related charities.

United Learning Trust

There were 72 United Learning state-funded schools in November 2019. They are free to attend, and accept students of all backgrounds, all faiths and none. The ethos is distinctly Christian and particularly Church of England.

The trust handles all the central bureaucracy that the schools need to have in place, for instance updating all of the statutory policies, such as these used in Lambeth  human resources, capital spending and procurement.

Human resources (staffing)
These schools do not recognise the Burgundy Book teachers' pay and conditions of service agreements. Existing staff are transferred over on their existing contracts, following TUPE new members of staff enter into an individual contract with the trust.

State-funded schools

Primary schools

 Abbey Hey Primary Academy, Gorton, Manchester
 Beacon View Primary Academy, Paulsgrove, Portsmouth
 Corngreaves Academy, Cradley Heath
 Cravenwood Primary Academy, Crumpsall, Manchester
 Dukesgate Academy, Salford
 The Galfrid School, Cambridge
 Grange Primary Academy, Kettering
 Ham Dingle Primary Academy, Pedmore, Stourbridge
 Hanwell Fields Community School, Banbury
 High Hazels Academy, Darnall, Sheffield
 Hill View Primary School, Banbury
 Hunningley Primary School, Barnsley
 Langford Primary School, Fulham, London
 Longshaw Primary Academy, Chingford, London
 Marborough Road Academy, Salford
 Orchard Meadow Primary School, Oxford
 Pegasus Primary School, Oxford
 Salisbury Manor Primary School, Chingford, London
 Silverdale Primary Academy, Newcastle-under-Lyme
 Southway Primary School, Bognor Regis
 Timbertree Academy, Cradley Heath
 The Victory Primary School, Paulsgrove, Portsmouth
 Walthamstow Primary Academy, Walthamstow, London
 Whittingham Primary Academy, Walthamstow, London
 Wilberforce Primary School, City of Westminster, London
 Windale Primary School, Oxford
 Winston Way Academy, Ilford, Essex
 Worsbrough Bank End Primary School, Barnsley

Secondary schools

 The Albion Academy
 Accrington Academy
 Avonbourne Boys' Academy
 Avonbourne Girls' Academy
 Bacon's College
 Barnsley Academy
 Cambridge Academy for Science and Technology
 Castle View Academy
 Coleridge Community College
 The Cornerstone Academy
 Ernest Bevin Academy
 Glenmoor Academy
 Holland Park School
 The Hurlingham Academy
 The Hyndburn Academy
 Irlam and Cadishead Academy
 The John Roan School
 John Smeaton Academy
 Lambeth Academy
 The Lowry Academy
 Manchester Academy
 Marsden Heights Community College
 Midhurst Rother College
 Newstead Wood School
 North Oxfordshire Academy
 Northampton Academy
 Nova Hreod Academy
 Paddington Academy
 Parkside Community College
 The Regis School
 Richard Rose Central Academy
 Richard Rose Morton Academy
 Salford City Academy
 Seahaven Academy
 Sedgehill School
 Sheffield Park Academy
 Sheffield Springs Academy
 Shoreham Academy
 Stockport Academy
 The Totteridge Academy
 Trumpington Community College
 Walthamstow Academy
 Winton Academy
 Wye School

All-through schools
 Goresbrook School
 Kettering Buccleuch Academy
 Swindon Academy
 William Hulme's Grammar School

United Church Schools Trust 

Fee paying schools in the associated United Church Schools Trust include:

Primary & preparatory schools
 Banstead Preparatory School
 Coworth Flexlands School
 Rowan Preparatory School
 St Ives School Haslemere

Senior & all-through schools
 AKS Lytham
 Ashford School
 Dunottar School
 Embley
 Guildford High School
 Tranby School
 Lincoln Minster School
 Surbiton High School

References

External links
 United Learning website
 Consultant interview with Mandy Coulter of UL over HR challenges

 
Charities based in Cambridgeshire
Educational charities based in the United Kingdom
Academy trusts